The 2010 Kyoto Sanga F.C. season was the 11th season of the club in J. League Division 1.

Competitions

Player statistics

Other pages
 J. League official site

Kyoto Sanga F.C.
Kyoto Sanga FC seasons